Battlefields Forever is the fourth studio album by American heavy metal band Big Business. It was recorded at Entourage Studios in North Hollywood, California.

Track listing
 "Chump Chance" – 2:20
 "No Vowels" – 3:48
 "Battlefields" – 4:35
 "Trees" – 6:11
 "Aurum" – 1:33
 "Doomsday, Today!" – 4:09
 "Heavy Shoes" – 3:30
 "Our Mutant" – 2:05
 "Lonely Lyle" – 9:18

Personnel 
Big Business
 Jared Warren – bass, vocals
 Coady Willis – drums, vocals
 Scott Martin – guitar, vocals

Technical personnel
 Dave Curran and Big Business – producing
 Dave Curran – recording
 Andrew Schneider and Dave Curran – mixing
 Scott Martin – mixing on "Aurum"
 Carl Saff – mastering

References

2013 albums
Big Business (band) albums